Spider Glacier may refer to:

 Spider Glacier (Phelps Ridge, Washington)
 Spider Glacier (Spider Mountain, Washington)